Ahmed Imtiaz Bulbul (1956–2019) was a Bangladeshi singer. The following is a list of his accolades:

Awards
Bangladesh National Film Awards

Bachsas Awards

Ifad Film Club Award

11th Channel I Music Awards
Best Music Director - 2004 won

Ekushey Padak

References

Bulbul, Ahmed Imtiaz
Bangladeshi awards